Þorsteinn Þorsteinsson  (born 1964) is an Icelandic former footballer who played as a defender. He was part of the Iceland national football team between 1982 and 1988.

Þorsteinn was a defender for Fram until 1990, playing in several national championship matches, after which he played for Víkingur in 1991–1992.

Internationally, Þorsteinn played seven matches for the Iceland national under-17 football team in 1979, six for the national under-19s in 1980, five for the under-21s in 1982–1985, and nine for the Iceland national football team in 1982–1988. In 1987 he played for the national Olympic team in a friendly against Bordeaux.

See also
 List of Iceland international footballers

References

External links
 

1964 births
Living people
Thorsteinn Thorsteinsson
Thorsteinn Thorsteinsson
Icelandic male footballers
Place of birth missing (living people)
Association football defenders
Knattspyrnufélagið Víkingur players